The Valencia Flyers are an Amateur Athletic Union (AAU)-sanctioned junior ice hockey team based in Valencia, Santa Clarita, California. The team plays in the Western Division of the Western States Hockey League at the Ice Station Valencia.

History
The franchise was founded in 2001 as the Valencia Flyers in the Western States Hockey League (WSHL) with three other expansion franchises. The team played as the Flyers from 2001 to 2003 until suspending operations for the 2003–04 season before returning for the 2004–05 season as the Valencia Vipers. In 2007, the team reverted to its original name.

From 2001 to 2007, the Flyers were a USA Hockey-sanctioned Tier III Junior B team. In 2007, the WSHL was promoted to Tier III Junior A. Before the 2011–12 season, the WSHL and all its team members, including the Flyers, became AAU-sanctioned and dropped its USA Hockey sanctioning, the first Junior A hockey league to make that transition.

At the end of the 2019–20 regular season, the Flyers' home rink was closed due to the COVID-19 pandemic, the Ice Station Valencia, which was also owned by the Flyers' owner Roger Perez. The closure was made permanent due to the financial losses incurred by the shutdown, leaving the future of the team undetermined.

Season-by-season records

Alumni
The Flyers have had a number of alumni move on to NCAA Division III, and higher levels of junior ice hockey, and professional ice hockey.

References

External links
 Official Website
 Official League Website

Ice hockey teams in California